Göktürk is an underground station on the M11 line of the Istanbul Metro in Eyüp. It has one entrance located on Atatürk Street in the Göktürk Tree Plantation in the town of Göktürk, Eyüp district, Turkey. The station is among the first five metro stations to be located outside of the city (urban area) of Istanbul.

Construction of the station began in 2016, along with the entire route from Gayrettepe to the Istanbul Airport.

The Göktürk Station was opened on 22 January 2023.

Layout

References

Istanbul metro stations
Railway stations opened in 2023
2023 establishments in Turkey